The Battle of the Crater was a battle of the American Civil War, part of the siege of Petersburg. It took place on Saturday, July 30, 1864, between the Confederate Army of Northern Virginia, commanded by General Robert E. Lee, and the Union Army of the Potomac, commanded by Major General George G. Meade (under the direct supervision of the general-in-chief, Lieutenant General Ulysses S. Grant).

After weeks of preparation, on July 30 Union forces exploded a mine in Major General Ambrose E. Burnside's IX Corps sector, blowing a gap in the Confederate defenses of Petersburg, Virginia. At that point, everything deteriorated rapidly for the Union attackers. Unit after unit charged into and around the crater, where most of them milled in confusion in the bottom of the crater. Grant considered this failed assault as "the saddest affair I have witnessed in this war."

The Confederates quickly recovered, and launched several counterattacks led by Brigadier General William Mahone. The breach was sealed off, and the Union forces were repulsed with severe casualties, while Brigadier General Edward Ferrero's division of black soldiers was badly mauled. It may have been Grant's best chance to end the siege of Petersburg; instead, the soldiers settled in for another eight months of trench warfare. 

Burnside was relieved of command for the final time for his role in the fiasco, and he was never again returned to command, and to make matters worse, Ferrero and General James H. Ledlie were observed behind the lines in a bunker, drinking liquor throughout the battle. Ledlie was criticized by a court of inquiry into his conduct that September, and in December he was effectively dismissed from the Army by Meade on orders from Grant, formally resigning his commission on January 23, 1865.

Background

During the Civil War, Petersburg, Virginia, was an important railhead, where four railroad lines from the south met before they continued to Richmond, Virginia, the capital of the Confederacy. Most supplies to General Lee's army and Richmond funneled through that location. Consequently, the Union regarded it as the "back door" to Richmond and as necessary for its defense. The result was the siege of Petersburg.

After Lee stopped Grant's attempt to seize Petersburg on June 15, the battle settled into a stalemate. Grant had learned a hard lesson at Cold Harbor about attacking Lee in a fortified position and was chafing at the inactivity to which Lee's trenches and forts had confined him. Finally, Lt. Col. Henry Pleasants, commanding the 48th Pennsylvania Infantry of Major General Ambrose E. Burnside's IX Corps, offered a novel proposal to break the impasse.

Pleasants, a mining engineer from Pennsylvania in civilian life, proposed digging a long mine shaft under the Confederate Army lines and planting explosive charges directly underneath a fort (Elliott's Salient) in the middle of the Confederate First Corps line. If successful, not only would all the defenders in the area be killed, but also a hole in the Confederate defenses would be opened. If enough Union troops filled the breach quickly enough and drove into the Confederate rear area, the Confederates would not be able to muster enough force to drive them out, and Petersburg might fall.

Burnside, whose reputation had suffered from his 1862 defeat at the Battle of Fredericksburg and his poor performance earlier that year at the Battle of Spotsylvania Court House, agreed to Pleasants's plan.

Mine construction

Digging began in late June, but even Grant and Meade saw the operation as a "mere way to keep the men occupied" and doubted it of any actual tactical value. They quickly lost interest, and Pleasants soon found himself with few materials for his project, and his men even had to forage for wood to support the structure.

Work progressed steadily, however. Earth was removed by hand and packed into improvised sledges made from cracker boxes fitted with handles, and the floor, wall, and ceiling of the mine were shored up with timbers from an abandoned wood mill and even from tearing down an old bridge.

The shaft was elevated as it moved toward the Confederate lines to make sure moisture did not clog up the mine, and fresh air was drawn in by an ingenious air-exchange mechanism near the entrance. A canvas partition isolated the miners' air supply from outside air and allowed miners to enter and exit the work area easily. The miners had constructed a vertical exhaust shaft located well behind Union lines. At the vertical shaft's base, a fire was kept continuously burning. A wooden duct ran the entire length of the tunnel and protruded into the outside air. The fire heated stale air inside of the tunnel, drawing it up the exhaust shaft and out of the mine by the chimney effect. The resulting vacuum then sucked fresh air in from the mine entrance via the wooden duct, which carried it down the length of the tunnel to the place in which the miners were working. That avoided the need for additional ventilation shafts, which could have been observed by the enemy, and it also easily disguised the diggers' progress.

On July 17, the main shaft reached under the Confederate position. Rumors of a mine construction soon reached the Confederates, but Lee refused to believe or act upon them for two weeks before he commenced countermining attempts, which were sluggish and uncoordinated, and were unable to discover the mine. However, General John Pegram, whose batteries would be above the explosion, took the threat seriously enough to build a new line of trenches and artillery points behind his position as a precaution. Shafts were also sunk by the Confederates in an effort to intercept the passage. Pleasants became aware of the Confederate's counter-movements and was able to frustrate their effort by changing the direction of the main and lateral galleries while increasing their depth below the surface.

The mine was in a "T"-shape. At its end, a perpendicular gallery of  extended in both directions. Grant and Meade suddenly decided to use the mine three days after it was completed after a failed attack known later as the First Battle of Deep Bottom. Union soldiers filled the mine with 320 kegs of gunpowder, totaling . A further  of packed earth was placed in the main gallery to prevent the explosion blasting out the mouth of the mine. On July 28, the powder charges were armed.

Preparation
Burnside had trained a division of United States Colored Troops (USCT) under Brigadier General Edward Ferrero to lead the assault. The division consisted of two brigades, one designated to go to the left of the crater and the other to the right. A regiment from both brigades was to leave the attack column and extend the breach by rushing perpendicular to the crater, and the remaining regiments were to rush through, seizing the Jerusalem Plank Road just  beyond, followed by the churchyard and, if possible, Petersburg itself. Burnside's two other divisions, made up of white troops, would then move in, supporting Ferrero's flanks and race for Petersburg itself. Two miles (3 km) behind the front lines, out of sight of the Confederates, the men of the USCT division were trained for two weeks on the plan.

Despite the careful planning and intensive training, on the day before the attack, Meade, who lacked confidence in the operation, ordered Burnside not to use the black troops in the lead assault. He claimed that if the attack failed, black soldiers would be killed needlessly, creating political repercussions in the North. Meade may have also ordered the change of plans because he lacked confidence in the black soldiers' abilities in combat. Burnside protested to Grant, who sided with Meade. When volunteers were not forthcoming, Burnside selected a replacement white division by having the three commanders draw lots. Brigadier General James H. Ledlie's 1st Division was selected, but he failed to brief the men on what was expected of them and was reported during the battle to be drunk, well behind the lines, and not providing leadership. (Ledlie would be dismissed for his actions during the battle.)

Opposing forces

Union

Confederate

Battle

The plan called for the mine to be detonated between 3:30 and 3:45 a.m. on the morning of July 30. Pleasants lit the fuse accordingly, but as with the rest of the mine's provisions, they had been given poor-quality fuses, which his men were forced to splice themselves. After more and more time passed and no explosion occurred (the impending dawn creating a threat to the men at the staging points, who were in view of the Confederate lines), two volunteers from the 48th Regiment (Lt. Jacob Douty and Sgt. Harry Reese) crawled into the tunnel. After discovering the fuse had burned out at a splice, they spliced on a length of new fuse and relit it. Finally, at 4:44 a.m., the charges exploded in a massive shower of earth, men, and guns.

The explosion immediately killed 278 Confederate soldiers of the 18th and 22nd South Carolina and the stunned Confederate troops did not direct any significant rifle or artillery fire at the enemy for at least 15 minutes. However, Ledlie's untrained division was not prepared for the explosion, and reports indicate they waited 10 minutes before leaving their own entrenchments. Footbridges were supposed to have been placed to allow them to cross their own trenches quickly. Because they were missing, however, the men had to climb into and out of their own trenches just to reach no-man's land. Once they had wandered to the crater, instead of moving around it, as the troops had been trained, they thought that it would make an excellent rifle pit in which to take cover. They therefore moved down into the crater itself, wasting valuable time and realizing too late that the crater was much too deep and exposed to function as a rifle pit and quickly becoming overcrowded while the Confederates, under Brigadier General William Mahone, gathered as many troops together as they could for a counterattack. In about an hour, they had formed up around the crater and began firing rifles and artillery down into it in what Mahone later described as a "turkey shoot."

The plan had failed, but Burnside, instead of cutting his losses, sent in Ferrero's men. Now faced with considerable flanking fire, they also descended into the crater, and for the next few hours, Mahone's soldiers, along with those of Major General Bushrod Johnson and artillery, slaughtered the IX Corps as it attempted to escape from the crater. Some Union troops eventually advanced and flanked to the right beyond the crater to the earthworks and assaulted the Confederate lines, driving the Confederates back for several hours in hand-to-hand combat. The charge reclaimed the earthworks and drove the Union force back towards the east.

Aftermath

Union casualties were 3,798 (504 killed, 1,881 wounded, 1,413 missing or captured), Confederate 1,491 (361 killed, 727 wounded, 403 missing or captured). Many of the Union losses were suffered by Ferrero's division of the United States Colored Troops. Both black and white wounded prisoners were taken to the Confederate hospital at Poplar Lawn, in Petersburg. Meade brought charges against Burnside, and a subsequent court of inquiry censured Burnside along with Brig. Gens. Ledlie, Ferrero, Orlando B. Willcox, and Col. Zenas R. Bliss. Burnside was never again assigned to duty. Although he was as responsible for the defeat as Burnside, Meade escaped immediate censure. However, in early 1865, the Congressional Joint Committee on the Conduct of the War exonerated Burnside and condemned Meade for changing the plan of attack, which did little good for Burnside, whose reputation had been ruined. As for Mahone, the victory, won largely because of his efforts in supporting Johnson's stunned men, earned him a lasting reputation as one of the best young generals of Lee's army in the last years of the war.

Grant wrote to Chief of Staff Henry W. Halleck, "It was the saddest affair I have witnessed in this war." He also stated to Halleck, "Such an opportunity for carrying fortifications I have never seen and do not expect again to have."

Pleasants, who had no role in the battle itself, received praise for his idea and its execution. When he was appointed a brevet brigadier general on March 13, 1865, the citation made explicit mention of his role.

Grant subsequently gave in his evidence before the Committee on the Conduct of the War:

Despite the battle being a tactical Confederate victory, the strategic situation in the Eastern Theater remained unchanged. Both sides remained in their trenches, and the siege continued.

Historic site
The area of the Battle of the Crater is a frequently-visited portion of Petersburg National Battlefield Park. The mine entrance is open for inspection annually on the anniversary of the battle. There are sunken areas, where air shafts and cave-ins extend up to the "T" shape near the end. The park includes many other sites, primarily those that were a portion of the Union lines around Petersburg.

In popular culture
 The Battle of the Crater was graphically portrayed in the opening scenes of the 2003 film Cold Mountain, starring Jude Law as a Confederate soldier. The film inaccurately depicts the giant explosion occurring in broad daylight; it actually happened in darkness at 4:44 A.M.

See also

 Lochnagar mine from the Battle of the Somme in the First World War

References
Notes

Bibliography
 
 .
 
 
 
 .
 Davis, William C., and the Editors of Time-Life Books. Death in the Trenches: Grant at Petersburg. Alexandria, VA: Time-Life Books, 1986. .
 .
 
 James, Alfred P.  "The Battle of the Crater." The Journal of the American Military History Foundation 2, no. 1 (Spring,1938), pp. 2–25
 Johnson, Robert Underwood, and Clarence C. Buel, eds. Battles and Leaders of the Civil War. 4 vols. New York: Century Co., 1884–1888. .
 Kennedy, Frances H., ed. The Civil War Battlefield Guide. 2nd ed. Boston: Houghton Mifflin Co., 1998. .
 McPherson, James M. Battle Cry of Freedom: The Civil War Era. Oxford History of the United States. New York: Oxford University Press, 1988. .
 Robertson, James I., Jr., and William Pegram. '"The Boy Artillerist": Letters of Colonel William Pegram, C.S.A.' The Virginia Magazine of History and Biography 98, no. 2 (The Trumpet Unblown: The Old Dominion in the Civil War), (1990), pp. 221–260.
 Lykes, Richard Wayne. Campaign for Petersburg, Ch. 6 "Battle of the Crater" for the National Park Service, 1970
 Salmon, John S. The Official Virginia Civil War Battlefield Guide. Mechanicsburg, PA: Stackpole Books, 2001. .
 
 Trudeau, Noah Andre. The Last Citadel: Petersburg, Virginia, June 1864 – April 1865. Baton Rouge: Louisiana State University Press, 1991. .
 National Park Service battle description
 CWSAC Report Update

Further reading
 
 Chernow, Ron. Grant. London: Penguin Press, 2017. .
 Greene, A. Wilson. A Campaign of Giants: The Battle for Petersburg. Vol. 1: From the Crossing of the James to the Crater. Chapel Hill: University of North Carolina Press, 2018. .
 Levin, Kevin M. Remembering the Battle of the Crater: War as Murder. Lexington: University Press of Kentucky, 2012. .
 Pleasants, Henry. Inferno at Petersburg. Edited by George H. Straley. Philadelphia: Chilton Book Co., 1961. .
 Schmutz, John F. The Battle of the Crater: a Complete History.  Jefferson, NC: McFarland & Company, Inc., 2009.

External links
 
 Battle of the Crater in Encyclopedia Virginia
  Battle of The Crater: Maps, Histories, Photos, and Preservation News (CWPT)
 Battle of the Crater Maps

Crater
Crater
Crater
Crater
Petersburg, Virginia
the Crater
1864 in Virginia
July 1864 events
Confederate war crimes